United Airlines Flight 624, a Douglas DC-6 airliner, registration NC37506, was a scheduled passenger flight from San Diego, California to New York City. The four-engined, propeller-driven  airplane crashed at 1:41 pm Eastern Daylight Time on June 17, 1948, outside of Aristes, Pennsylvania, resulting in the deaths of all four crew members and 39 passengers on board. The crew had been responding to a false signal of a fire in the front cargo hold by releasing , apparently without opening the pressure relief valves. The part-incapacitated crew began an emergency descent and hit a high-voltage power line.

Accident sequence
Flight 624 from San Diego had just completed a routine initial descent as part of its approach into the New York area, when the forward cargo hold fire indicator light illuminated, leading the flight crew to believe a fire was in that cargo hold. Although this later turned out to be a false alarm, the crew decided to discharge  bottles into the forward cargo hold, to try to extinguish the possible fire.

While proper operating procedure called for opening the cabin pressure relief valves prior to discharging the  bottles, to allow for venting of the  gas buildup in the cabin and cockpit,  no evidence was found of the crew opening the relief valves. Consequently, the released  gas seeped back into the cockpit from the front cargo hold and apparently partially incapacitated the flight crew. The crew then put the aircraft into an emergency descent, and as it descended lower, it hit a high-voltage power line, bursting into flames, then smashing through the trees of a wooded hillside.

Notable victims
Among the passengers were Broadway theatre impresario Earl Carroll and his girlfriend, actress Beryl Wallace, plus Henry L. Jackson, men's fashion editor of Collier's Weekly and co-founder of Esquire.
The actress and former Mrs. Jack Oakie, Venita Varden, was also aboard.

Investigation and final report
The Civil Aeronautics Board investigated the crash and published a narrative describing the following sequence of events in its final report:The airplane, named Mainliner Utah, arrived in Chicago at 09:52 en route from Los Angeles to New York. After a 52-minute turnaround, the DC-6 departed for New York. The airplane climbed en route to its planned altitude of 17,000 feet. At 12:23, and at 12:27 the crew made a routine acknowledgment of a clearance to descend en route to an altitude between 13,000 and 11,000 feet. A little later, a fire warning led the crew to believe that a fire had erupted in the forward cargo hold. They then discharged at least one bank of the  fire extinguisher bottles in the forward cargo hold. Because they did not follow the correct procedure, the cabin pressure relief valves were closed. This caused hazardous concentrations of the gas to enter into the cockpit. These concentrations reduced the pilots to a state of confused consciousness probably resulting in loss of consciousness. An emergency descent was initiated until it described a shallow left turn, heading towards constantly rising terrain. Five miles east of Shamokin, the airplane, flying only 200 feet above the ground, entered a right climbing turn. As it passed to the north of Mt. Carmel, the climbing turning attitude increased sharply. The airplane then crashed in a power line clearing on wooded hillside at an elevation of 1,649 feet. The airplane struck a 66,000-volt transformer, severed power lines, and burst into flames.
Investigation revealed that the fire warning in the cargo compartment had been false.

— CAB File No. 1-0075-48

The CAB concluded with the following probable cause for the accident: "The Board determines that the probable cause of this accident was the incapacitation of the crew by a concentration of  gas in the cockpit."

See also
 Centralia, Pennsylvania
 List of accidents and incidents involving commercial aircraft
 TWA Flight 513
 United Airlines Flight 608

References

External links 
 Final Report - Civil Aeronautics Board - PDF
 

Aviation accidents and incidents in the United States in 1948
1948 in Pennsylvania
Airliner accidents and incidents in Pennsylvania
Airliner accidents and incidents caused by pilot error
Airliner accidents and incidents caused by in-flight fires
Airliner accidents and incidents caused by pilot incapacitation
624
Accidents and incidents involving the Douglas DC-6
History of Columbia County, Pennsylvania
June 1948 events in the United States